Maydell is the name of a Baltic-German noble family and part of the Uradel. The family lived in Estonia for several centuries and was one of its notable families. In documents and texts from earlier centuries, the family name is occasionally written Maydel or Maidel.

People 
 Gertrud Maydell, mentioned 1554–1559, abbess of St. Michael's Abbey in Reval (now Tallinn).
 Tönnies Maydell (d 1600), admiral of the Swedish fleet, Landrat, first knight's captain in the history of the Estonian Knighthood, 1593–1598
 Jürgen Maydell (d 22 July 1637), Landrat, Swedish statthalter at Schloss Lohde in Estonia
 Hermann Maydell († vor 1642), Polish Chamberlain, President of the Landrat Collegium in the Courland diocese of Pilten
 Otto Ernst von Maydell (1608–1670), Polish Obristleutnant, Starost of Pilten, hereditary Lord of Zierau, Pundicken, Rawen and Birsen, Lord of Punia and Schloss Dondangen in Courland
 Georg Johann Freiherr von Maydell (1648–1710), Swedish general of infantry, Swedish Freiherr from 26 June 1693
 Otto Wulbrand von Maydell (1680–1747), Electoral Hanoverian lieutenant general
 Otto Johann Freiherr von Maydell (1682– nach 1736), Swedish and Russian major general
 Carl August von Maydell (1733–1802), Electoral Hanoverian lieutenant general
 Ernst von Maydell (Landrat) (1767–1843), Estonian Landrat
 Reinhard Gottlieb von Maydell (1771–1846), Estonian Landrat and Consistorial President
 August Baron von Maydell (1787–1869), Russian lieutenant general
 Georg Gustav Baron von Maydell (1791–1876), actual Staatsrat, President of the Courland Cameral Court, Vice-Governor of Courland
 Friedrich Ludwig von Maydell (1795–1846), historical painter, friend and travelling companion of Ludwig Richter in Italy.
 Karl Baron von Maydell (1798–1856), Russian major general
 Karl Anton Baron von Maydell (1816–1885), Russian lieutenant general of artillery
 Georg Benedikt Baron von Maydell (1817–1881), Russian general, commander of Peter and Paul Fortress in St. Petersburg 
 Peter von Maydell (1819–1884), doctor, reformer of hygiene in Saint Petersburg
 Gregor Baron von Maydell (1821–1876), Russian rear admiral
 Eduard Baron von Maydell (1830–1899), Russian chamberlain and state councillor, knight’s captain in the Estonian Knighthood 1871–1878 and 1890–1892
 Eduard Baron von Maydell (1842–1918), Russian major general
 Christoph Baron von Maydell (1834– ), Russian major general
 Gerhard Baron von Maydell (1835–1894), geographer and ethnologist, researcher of East Siberia
 Viktor Baron von Maydell (1838–1898), railway engineer, town councillor (Stadtverordneter) in Reval from 1877, Stadtrat from 1880, Stadthaupt (Bürgermeister = mayor) of Reval 1885–1893
 Reinhold (Roman) Baron von Maydell (1859–1931), Russian major general,
 Ignaz Baron von Maydell (1864–1930), Russian Lieutenant general, Prof. der Chemie an der Universität Laibach
 Anna von Maydell (1861–1944), Baltic-German artist and metalbeater
 Wladimir Baron von Maydell (1864–1919), Russian lieutenant general, Commander of the Persian Cossack Brigade from 1915 to 1917, last adjutant of Czar Nicholas II.
 Ernst von Maydell (1888–1960), German-Baltic graphic designer and artist 
 Eveline von Maydell (1890–1962), German silhouette artist
 Hans-Jürgen Baron von Maydell (1932–2010), German forestry scientist
 Bernd Baron von Maydell (1934–2018), German social and employment lawyer and professor
 Sabine von Maydell (* 1955), German actress
 Oona von Maydell (* 1985), German actress

References

Further reading 
 Paul Johansen: Die Estlandliste des Liber Census Daniae. Kopenhagen und Reval 1933
 Carl Arvid von Klingspor: Baltisches Wappenbuch. Stockholm 1882 link
 Karl Baron von Maydell: Das freiherrliche Geschlecht von Maydell. Helsingfors 1868, Digitalisat
 Bogdan Baron von Maydell: Das freiherrliche Geschlecht von Maydell. 1. Fortsetzung 1868–1894, Reval 1895
 Eduard u. Kurt Baron von Maydell: Das freiherrliche Geschlecht von Maydell. 2. Fortsetzung 1895–1978, Tostedt und Bonn 1979
 A.T. Gløersen: Slægten Meidell i Norge og Danmark med nærstaaende linier hvorunder særskilte meddelelser om slægterne Barclay de Tolly og de Rochlenge, Kristiania Bd. 1, 1900, Bd. 2, 1903
 Julius Graf von Oeynhausen: Die von Maydell im Hannoverschen. In: Der Deutsche Herold VIII. Jg., Berlin 1877, S. 143–144
 Wilhelm Baron von Wrangell: Die Estländische Ritterschaft, ihre Ritterschaftshauptmänner und Landräte. C.A. Starke Verlag, Limburg/Lahn 1967
 Genealogisches Handbuch der baltischen Ritterschaften, Teil Estland, Bd. I, Görlitz 1933, S. 131–158, Nachträge S. 22–23, Korrekturen link
 Genealogisches Handbuch der Baltischen Ritterschaften, Teil Livland, Bd. I, Görlitz 1935, S. 609–633
 Genealogisches Handbuch der Baltischen Ritterschaften, Teil Kurland, Bd. I, Görlitz 1936, S. 537–546
 Genealogisches Handbuch des Adels, Freiherrliche Häuser A, Band V, 1963, S. 223–287; Bd. X, 1977, S. 207–248; Bd. XVI, 1992, S. 183–230; Bd. XXII, 2002, S. 304–356, C.A. Starke Verlag, Limburg/Lahn

External links 

 Weitere Darstellungen des Familienwappens im Estnischen Historischen Archiv, Tartu/Dorpat (deutsch)

Baltic nobility
Baltic-German noble families